Big Creek is a stream in the U.S. state of Iowa. It is a tributary to the Des Moines River.

Big Creek was so named due to its relatively large size compared to other nearby streams.

References

Rivers of Iowa
Rivers of Boone County, Iowa
Rivers of Polk County, Iowa